Albert Boyd Douglas, known as Boyd Douglas (born 13 July 1950) is a Unionist politician in Northern Ireland who was a Member of the Northern Ireland Assembly (MLA) for East Londonderry from 1998 to 2003.

The son of William Douglas (Northern Ireland politician), he attended Strabane Agriculture College before working as a farmer.  He was elected as an Ulster Unionist Party representative on Limavady Borough Council in 1997, but soon resigned in opposition to the Good Friday Agreement.

Douglas was elected to the Northern Ireland Assembly in 1998 as an independent Unionist representing East Londonderry.  With two other anti-agreement Unionists, he formed the United Unionist Coalition.  He retained his seat on the council in 2001, but lost his Assembly seat, along with all the other Coalition MLAs, in 2003.  In 2005, he was able to top the poll in his seat in Limavady.

Douglas subsequently joined Traditional Unionist Voice, and contested  East Londonderry seat for the party at the 2011 Assembly election, in which he came 10th out of the 12 candidates and was not elected to a seat. In reference to his decision to run, Douglas said: "Though public service has been part of my life and upbringing, returning to Stormont has not been a burning ambition. But while I’ve watched the past 4 years of failure and deadlock, with virtually nothing done for East Londonderry, I’ve concluded it requires us all, myself included, to try and make things better."

References

External links
Northern Ireland Elections: Limavady Borough Council Elections 1993-2005
The Northern Ireland Assembly

1950 births
Living people
Members of Limavady Borough Council
Northern Ireland MLAs 1998–2003
Independent members of the Northern Ireland Assembly
Ulster Unionist Party councillors
Farmers from Northern Ireland
Traditional Unionist Voice politicians